BancNet (also spelled Bancnet) is a Philippine-based interbank network connecting the ATM networks of local and offshore banks, and the country's single interbank network in the Philippines in terms of the number of member banks and annual transactions.  Due to its status as the country's single ATM switch operator, it is designated by the Bangko Sentral ng Pilipinas (BSP) as the country's national ATM network.

BancNet is also the exclusive gateway of China's UnionPay, allowing access to the nearly 1 billion ATM cardholders from China. BancNet is allied with global payment brand JCB International. Through this alliance, JCB cardholders can make cash advances at participating BancNet member ATMs nationwide.
Bancnet interconnects with international card networks Diners Club, Discover, KFTC, Mastercard, and Visa.
 
BancNet serves more than 41 million ATM cardholders of its 124 members and affiliates with over 21,000 ATMs and more than 304,000 POS terminals.

In 2008, Expressnet outsourced its ATM operations to BancNet. On January 30, 2015, BancNet and MegaLink announced their merger and will retain itself as its brand. With this and having no more competition, BancNet has become the Philippines' single ATM switch and major cashless transactions and payments network operator.

History
BancNet was founded on July 17, 1990, as the Philippines' second ATM consortium when the ATMs of eight banks, PCI Bank (later Equitable PCI Bank, now Banco de Oro), Security Bank, Chinabank, RCBC, Allied Bank (now part of PNB), Metrobank, International Exchange Bank (now part of UnionBank) and CityTrust Banking Corp. (now part of BPI) formed BancNet. Other members have since joined.

In 1994, BancNet introduced the a point-of-sale system to serve the retail payment requirements of cardholders. In 1997, BancNet started offering website hosting, email and surfing services to member banks at affordable rates.

In 2002, BancNet started its online banking and payment gateway system.

It was during the anniversary business forum of 2002 that BancNet introduced Interbank Funds Transfer, reportedly the first consortium-run automated transfer facility in the region. The product allows real-time, online transfer of money among the members of BancNet using either the payment gateway, the ATM or a cardholder's cellular phone.

A partnership with Globe Telecom, the second largest telecoms company in the Philippines, in 2006 allowed BancNet to expand ATM-like functions to the mobile phones of cardholders. This was followed by a similar agreement in early 2007 with Smart Communications, the dominant telecoms company, for mobile banking.

A Memorandum of Agreement was signed in 2007 with Nationlink, admitting the latter as the first network alliance member of BancNet. This allows all the rural bank members of Nationlink to enjoy the convenience of electronic banking on 8,000 ATMs and more than 10,000 Point-of-Sale terminals nationwide.

InstaPay

BancNet is the clearing switch operator of real-time electronic funds transfer clearing house InstaPay, one of the two electronic fund transfer services commissioned by the BSP (the other being PesoNet). As of 2022, the service shall be rebranded into InstaPay, powered by BancNet.

Equity members

Asia United Bank
Banco de Oro
Bank of Commerce
Bank of the Philippine Islands
China Banking Corporation
Citibank Philippines
CTBC Bank Philippines
Development Bank of the Philippines
EastWest Banking Corporation
Equicom Savings Bank
Land Bank of the Philippines
Metropolitan Bank and Trust Company
Philippine Bank of Communications
Philippine Trust Company
Philippine National Bank
Philippine Veterans Bank
Rizal Commercial Banking Corporation
Robinsons Bank Corporation
Security Bank Corporation
Standard Chartered Bank Philippines
Sterling Bank of Asia
The Hongkong and Shanghai Banking Corporation
UnionBank

Other members

All Bank (formerly Optimum Bank)
Bangko Mabuhay
Bank of Makati
Bankways
Bayad (formerly Bayad Center, InstaPay only)
BDO Network Bank (subsidiary of Banco de Oro)
BPI Direct Savings Bank
BPI Family Savings Bank (subsidiary of Bank of the Philippine Islands)
BPI Globe BanKO
Cantilan Bank Inc. 
Card Bank, Inc.
CARD SME Bank Inc.
Cebuana Lhuillier Rural Bank
China Bank Savings (subsidiary of China Banking Corporation)
CIMB Bank Philippines
Citibank
City Savings Bank (subsidiary of Union Bank of the Philippines)
Citystate Savings Bank
D'Asian Hills Bank
DCPay Philippines Inc. [Coins.PH] (InstaPay only)
Deutsche Bank Philippines
Dumaguete Bank
Dungganon Bank, Inc.
EastWest Rural Bank, Inc. (d.b.a. Komo, a mostly digital bank)
Enterprise Bank, Inc.
Entrepreneur Bank
EON Bank PH (a UnionBank subsidiary)
GCash Inc.
GoTyme
GrabPay Philippines (InstaPay only)
Isla Bank
JuanCash (InstaPay only)
Katipunan Banking Corporation
KEB Hanah Bank Manila (formerly Korea Exchange Bank)
Lazada Wallet Philippines (applied, for InstaPay only)
Legaspi Savings Bank
Luzon Development Bank
Malayan Savings Bank
Maybank Philippines, Inc.
MegaLink (as independent ATM deployer)
Metro South Coop Bank
MaxBank
National Confederation of Cooperatives (NATCCO)
Opportunity Kauswagan Bank (OK Bank)
Palawan Pawnshop (InstaPay only)
Partner Rural Bank
PayMaya Philippines Inc. (Maya Bank)
PBCOM Rural Bank (formerly Banco Dipolog)
Planbank
Philippine Resources Savings Bank
Philippine Business Bank
Philippine Postal Savings Bank (PostBank)
Philippine Savings Bank (subsidiary of Metropolitan Bank and Trust Company)
Pito AxM Platforms Inc. (a Seven Bank subsidiary)
Producers Bank
Queen City Development Bank
Quezon Capital Rural Bank, Inc. (QCRB)
RCBC Savings Bank (subsidiary of Rizal Commercial Banking Corporation)
Rural Bank of Tangub City
Security Bank Savings (subsidiary of Security Bank Corporation)
ShopeePay Philippines (InstaPay only)
South Bank, Inc.
Standard Chartered Bank Philippines (acquired by EastWest Banking Corporation since 2016)
StarPay (InstaPay only)
Sterling Bank of Asia
Sun Savings Bank
Tonik Bank (InstaPay only, not yet serviceable for incoming bank transfers)
UBX Philippines (i2i Mobile ATM, a UnionBank subsidiary)
Yuanta Savings Bank (formerly Tongyang Savings Bank)
UCPB Savings Bank (subsidiary of United Coconut Planters Bank)
WealthBank
World Partners Bank, Inc.
Zambank

See also
Expressnet
MegaLink
Nationlink (Alliance Member of BancNet)
ATM usage fees
ENS

References

External links
BancNet

Interbank networks
Financial services companies of the Philippines
Companies based in Makati